Grigor Dimitrov was the defending champion, but did not compete in the Juniors this year.

Bernard Tomic won in the final 6–1, 6–3 against Chase Buchanan.

Seeds

Draw

Finals

Top half

Section 1

Section 2

Bottom half

Section 3

Section 4

External links 
 Main Draw

Boys' Singles
US Open, 2009 Boys' Singles